Narsapur(G) is a Town Mandal in Nirmal district in  Telangana State. It was previously famous for its bangles.  Thus, it is commonly called Gajula Narsapur. It is approximately 20 km away from its nearest Municipality Nirmal city and 20 km from Bhainsa town.  It is famous for its Mallikarjuna temple near Devuni cheruvu.

Climate
The climate of the town is characterized by the hot summer and is generally dry except during the southwest monsoon. The year may be divided into four seasons. The winter season from December to February is followed by the summer season from March to May. The period from June to September constitutes the southwest monsoon season, while October and November form the post-monsoon season. The weather of the area is also dictated by the seven lakes around the town.

The relative humidity is high during the southwest monsoon season. The air is generally dry during the rest of the year, the district part of the year being the summer season when the humidity in the afternoon is 25%.

The town's rainfall generally increases from the southwest towards the northeast. About 85% of annual rainfall is received during the southwest monsoon season. The peak rainy month is July. The variation in the Annual rainfall of a year is not very large. Annual rainfall of the district is 1044.5m.m.

The cold weather commences towards the end of November when the temperature begins to fall rapidly. December is generally the coldest month, with a daily maximum temperature of about 29 C and a minimum of 3 c.

In summer, from mid-April, the temperature begins to rise rapidly. May is generally the hottest month, with a daily maximum temperature of around 48 c.

Winds are light to moderate with some strengthening from May to August. During the post-monsoon and cold season, winds blow mostly from the east or northeast. By March, south westerlies start blowing and continue the rest of summer. The southwest monsoon season winds are mostly from directions between the southwest and northwest.

Villages in Narsapur G Mandal
1.Narsapur G
2.Kusli
3.Rampur
4.Temburni
5.Dharyapur
6.Naseerabad
7.Nandan
8.Bamni
9.Turati
10.Arli K
11.Burgupally K
12.Dongurgaon
13.Gollamada
14.Thimmapur
15.Burugupally G

Assembly Constituency
Narsapur comes under Nirmal constituency is assembly constituency in Telanga State.  There were 165,322 registered voters in Nirmal constituency in 2009 elections.

List of Elected Members:
1957 - Koripelly Muthyam Reddy''''''
1978 - P. Ganga Reddy
1962 - P. Narsa Reddy
1983 - Aindla Bheema Reddy
1985 - Samudrala Venugopal Chary
1996- Nalla Indrakaran Reddy
1999 & 2004 - Allola Indrakaran Reddy
2009 - Aleti Maheswara Reddy
2014 - Allola Indrakaran Reddy
2019 - Allola Indrakaran Reddy

Tourist places
Tourist spots in the area include:

 Kuntala waterfalls
 Pochera waterfalls
 Nirmal Toys
 Nirmal Paintings
 Mallikarjuna temple, Narsapur G
 Kadili Temple
 Basar Saraswathi Temple
 Nirmal Shyamghar
 Sadarmat Anacut
 Swarna Project
 Kadem Project
 Kalwa Narsimha Swamy Temple

References

External links
 NirmalCity

Cities and towns in Adilabad district